The Paenibacillaceae are a family of Gram-positive bacteria.

References 

 
Bacillales